"Foolish Lullaby" is a song by Laura Branigan from her fourth studio album Hold Me (1985). It was written by Jack White and Mark Spiro, and produced by White.

Paul Anka versions

Paul Anka 1993 versions
In 1993, Paul Anka rewrote "Foolish Lullaby" and recorded it as "It's Hard to Say Goodbye". It was produced by C+C Music Factory. This solo version was included on his 1993 album, Face in the Mirror. He also recorded it as a duet with Filipino singer Regine Velasquez, which was featured on the Asian edition of Face in the Mirror and also on Velasquez's 1993 album, Reason Enough.

Paul Anka and Celine Dion versions
In 1996, Anka and Celine Dion recorded a bilingual version of "It's Hard to Say Goodbye", in which Dion sings in Spanish and Anka in English. The Spanish lyrics were written by Adrian Posse and Humberto Gatica, and the track was produced by David Foster. Entitled "Mejor Decir Adios", the song was included on Anka's Amigos album, released on July 30, 1996.

In 1998, Anka and Dion recorded "It's Hard to Say Goodbye" as a duet in English. This version was produced by Foster and Gatica, and included on Anka's A Body of Work album, issued on September 22, 1998.

"It's Hard to Say Goodbye" was released as a promotional single for the US adult contemporary radio stations on January 25, 1999. It included short radio version of the song lasting four minutes and sixteen seconds. Chuck Taylor from Billboard praised the track in his review and compared it to Barbra Streisand and Neil Diamond duet, "You Don't Bring Me Flowers". In March 1999, Fred Bronson from Billboard wondered if with "It's Hard to Say Goodbye" Dion could soon have three duets on the Adult Contempotrary chart, as she was already charting with "I'm Your Angel" and "The Prayer". Eventually, "It's Hard to Say Goodbye" did not enter Billboard'''s AC Top 25 chart, but it reached number twenty-six on the Radio & Records'' AC Top 30 chart.

References

External links
 

1985 songs
1999 singles
Celine Dion songs
Laura Branigan songs
Pop ballads
Songs about heartache
Songs written by Jack White (music producer)
Songs written by Mark Spiro
Songs written by Paul Anka
Male–female vocal duets